Siris Chandra Chattopadhyaya (18731967) was a Bengali civil servant and politician from East Bengal. He was a Member of the 1st National Assembly of Pakistan as a representative of East Pakistan. He was born in Dhaka.

Career
Chattopadhyaya was a member of the Constituent Assembly of Pakistan. He had argued for a secular Pakistan in the constituent assembly. He was opposed to the passing of the Objectives Resolution of 1949.

References

Pakistani MNAs 1947–1954
Living people
Year of birth missing (living people)
Members of the Constituent Assembly of Pakistan